The SNCASE S.E.5000 Baroudeur was a French single-engined lightweight fighter designed by SNCASE (Sud-Est) for the NATO NBMR-1 "Light Weight Strike Fighter" competition. An unusual design without a conventional landing gear, it used a wheeled trolley for take-off and three retractable skids to land. The Baroudeur did not enter production.

Design and development
The Baroudeur was a lightweight fighter, designed to operate from grass airfields, conceived and designed in the early stages of the Cold War.
The Baroudeur (French Foreign Legion slang for brawling soldier) was the brainchild of Wsiewołod "John" Jakimiuk, a Polish engineer who had worked on similar concepts at PZL and Avro Canada. The rationale behind the design was to operate tactical jet interceptors from unprepared sites in case the air force bases were destroyed in a preemptive strike (drawing from the German experience in the last stages of World War II).  It used a wheeled trolley that could be used for take off from grass, and three retractable skids (the third at the tail for landing) for take off from snow- or ice-covered surfaces. The skids incorporated a crude suspension/damping system made of rubber rings. The three-wheeled trolley had provision to use rockets (two or four according to terrain plus two back-up) if needed to assist.  Apart from the landing gear the aircraft was a conventional shoulder-wing monoplane with a 38 degree swept wing and tail surfaces and powered by a SNECMA Atar 101C turbojet with wing-root intakes. The first of two prototypes flew on the 1 August 1953. Three pre-production aircraft designated the S.E.5003 were also built with Atar 101D turbojet engines but the type was not ordered into production.

Operational testing
Extensive testing was conducted by test pilot Jacques "Tito" Maulandi and though the underfunded prototypes proved troublesome, the design also showed some promising characteristics. It was later dubbed a "Jet dirt bike" for its off-road capabilities.
It proved capable to fly with its take off trolley in place (so it could easily switch to another unprepared airstrip), to take off with the skids only on some suitable terrain (sometimes with RATO rockets for extra thrust), to land on beaches (it was test flown off the La Baule beach; on one occasion barely escaped the incoming tide), frozen lakes, motorways, even marshes.

It managed barely supersonic speeds reaching  over Istres air base.
Testing also included high speed runs with a mocked-up crude rocket propelled airplane (with straight wings and some working controls) on the real rocket-powered trolley, complete with final separation at over 160 km/h (100 mph).
On one such occasion the test pilot suffered concussion and light injuries when the trolley cartwheeled at high speed and  became unmanageable. 
The SE 5000 was entered, along with the promising Breguet Taon in the NATO test session for a lightweight fighter but lost out to the Fiat G91.

The five prototype and preproduction Baroudeurs were disposed of as gunnery targets at Cazaux airforce base in south-west France but a non-profit concern organisation (Ailes Anciennes Le Bourget, with ties to Le Bourget Air Museum) managed to scavenge most of the remains of three or four wrecks to create one SE 5003 in display condition.

Variants

S.E.5000 Baroudeur
Prototype powered by a SNECMA Atar 101C turbojet, two built.
S.E.5003 Baroudeur
Pre-production aircraft powered by a SNECMA Atar 101D turbojet, three built.

Specifications (S.E.5003)

See also

Notes

Bibliography

External links

Contemporary reporting in Flight 1954

1950s French fighter aircraft
Baroudeur
Single-engined jet aircraft
Shoulder-wing aircraft
Aircraft first flown in 1953